The name Ryland can refer to several things:

Places
Ryland, Alabama, United States
Ryland, Lincolnshire, England
Ryland, Hordaland, Norway
Ryland Heights, Kentucky, USA

People

Surname
Adolfine Mary Ryland (1903–1983), English artist
Bertha Ryland (1882-1977), militant suffragette
Bob Ryland (1920-2020), American former tennis player and coach
Sir Charles Smith-Ryland (1927–1989), English landowner and farmer, Lord Lieutenant of Warwickshire
George Washington Ryland (1827–1910), Wisconsin politician
George Ryland (Queensland politician) (1855–1920), member of the Queensland Legislative Assembly
Henry Ryland (1856–1924), British painter, book illustrator, decorator and designer
Herman Witsius Ryland (1760–1838), English colonial administrator in Canada
Ingrid Ryland (born 1989), Norwegian footballer
Jens Fredrik Ryland (born 1974), Norwegian guitarist
John Ryland (1753–1825), English Baptist minister
Jonathan Edwards Ryland (1798–1866), English man of letters and tutor
Louisa Ryland (1814–1889), English philanthropist
Octavius Ryland (1800–1886), English convict transported to Australia, later a school teacher
Robert Ryland (1805–1899), first president of Richmond College, Virginia
William Wynne Ryland (1732/8–1783), English engraver
William Ryland (1770–1846), American businessman and Methodist minister

Given name
Ryland Adams (born 1991), American YouTuber
Sir Ryland Adkins (1862–1925), English lawyer, judge and politician
Ryland Blackinton (born 1982), American musician and actor
Ryland Bouchard (born 1979), American vocalist and musician
Ry Cooder (born 1947), American musician
Ryland Davies (born 1943), Welsh operatic tenor
Ryland Fletcher (1799–1885), American farmer, and politician
Ryland James (born 1999), Canadian pop singer
Ryland Milner (1909–1999), American football coach
Ryland Moranz (born 1986), Canadian folk/roots singer-songwriter
Ryland H. New (1888–1979), Canadian businessman and racehorse owner
T. Ryland Sanford (1878–1952), first President of the Chatham Training School, Virginia
Ryland Steen (born 1980), American drummer
Ryland Dillard Tisdale (1894–1942), American naval officer

Fiction
Dennis Ryland, character in American TV series The 4400
Harris Ryland, character in American TV series Dallas
Ryland Grace, character in sci-fi novel Project Hail Mary

Other
CalAtlantic Homes, American home builder formerly known as Ryland Homes

See also
Rylands
Rylan (disambiguation)